This is a list of hospitals in Cyprus.

Urban hospitals 

SHSO (State Health Services Organisation or OKYPY) Hospitals
Nicosia New General Hospital
Nicosia Old General Hospital
Makarios Paediatric Hospital, Nicosia
Limassol New General Hospital
Limassol Old General Hospital
Larnaca New General Hospital
Larnaca Old General Hospital
Paphos General Hospital

Private Hospitals
Mediterranean Hospital of Cyprus, Limassol
Nicosia Polyclinic, Nicosia
Aretaeio Hospital, Nicosia
Apollonion Private Hospital, Nicosia
Hippocrateion Private Hospital, Nicosia
American Heart Institute, Nicosia
Ygia Polyclinic, Limassol
Saint Raphael Private Hospital, Larnaca
Iasis Hospital, Paphos

Rural hospitals and medical centres 

Agros
Akaki
Athienou
Avdimou
Dali
Drouseia
Evrychou
Fyti
Kampos
Klirou
Kofinou
Kyperounta
Laneia
Pano Lefkara
Omodos
Ormidia
Palaiochori
Panagia
Paralimni
Pedoulas
Platres
Polis
Pomos
Pyrgos
Salamiou
Tersefonou

Cyprus

Hospitals
Cyprus
Cyprus